Nets may refer to:
The plural of any net
Brooklyn Nets, an NBA basketball team

NETS as an acronym may refer to:
 NETS (company), Network for Electronic Transfers, a cashless payment system in Singapore
 Neuroendocrine tumors
 Newborn Emergency Transport Service, an Australian medical service
Negative Emission Technologies, removing greenhouse gases from the atmosphere
 New English Translation of the Septuagint, a translation of koine Greek scriptures
 New Europe Transmission System, a proposed joint natural gas transmission network
 Nazareth Evangelical Theological Seminary (NETS), an evangelical seminary in Israel
 Neutrophil extracellular traps
 Singh Program in Networked & Social Systems Engineering (NETS), a degree program offered by the University of Pennsylvania

See also
 NET (disambiguation)